Ludovicus Neeffs (22 January 1617 – c. 1649?) was a Flemish Baroque painter who specialized in architectural interiors of churches. He is the least known of the Neeffs family of painters that were active in Antwerp, and several works attributed to either his father, Pieter Neeffs I, or younger brother, Pieter Neeffs II, might actually be from his hand.

Notes

External links
Biography at the Museo del Prado's online encyclopedia 

1617 births
Flemish Baroque painters
1640s deaths
Catholic painters